Saeed Marie (30 August 1954 – 16 February 2022) was an Egyptian judge. He served on the Supreme Constitutional Court of Egypt, and was appointed its chancellor in July 2019.

Marie, a judge who served as the vice chancellor of the Supreme Constitutional Court, was born 30 August 1954 in Giza, Egypt. He obtained a law degree in the Cairo University in 1976 and a public law diploma 1978, and diploma in admin. science in 1979 both at Cairo University.

He joined the State Council in 1977 and rose to be the assistant judge in the State Council, he became the judge in 1990 under the authority of commissioners of the Constitutional Court. He rose to be the chairman of authority of commissioners of the Constitutional Court in 1999 and of which he rose to become the vice chancellor of the Supreme Constitutional Court in 2002 until 2019, where he was appointed  chancellor.

He died on 16 February 2022, at the age of 67.

References

External links 
 
 

1954 births
2022 deaths
People from Giza
Scholars of constitutional law
20th-century Egyptian judges
Cairo University alumni
21st-century Egyptian judges